Zoltán Takács (born 26 November 1983, in Budapest) is a Hungarian football player who currently plays for Pátyi SE.

Club career

Budapest Honvéd
Takács spent the first four and a half years of his career at Budapest Honvéd FC where he played at the Hungarian top level, except in the 2003–04 season where Budapest Honvéd FC was playing in the NB II. In the first division of the Hungarian League, he played in 72 games and scored 5 goals.

In the 2003–04 season Budapest Honvéd FC, a second division club at the time, reached the final of the Hungarian Cup where they lost 3-1 to Ferencvárosi TC. Their performance lead Takács' club into the UEFA Cup 2004–05 where they were defeated by a penalty shoot-out against the Polish side of Amica Wronki in the second qualifying round of the tournament.

Debreceni VSC
In 2006, the Budapest Honvéd FC coach  Aldo Dolcetti was replaced by Attila Supka. Upon his appointment Supka made cuts to the team and  Takács moved to Debreceni VSC on a free transfer.

Újpest FC
Takács played for Italian side SPAL 1907 during the 2009 Spring season. On 4 July 2009 Újpest FC signed Takács.

Honours
 Hungarian League: 2007
 Hungarian Cup: 2008

External links

www.hlsz.hu

1983 births
Living people
Footballers from Budapest
Hungarian footballers
Association football defenders
Hungary international footballers
Budapest Honvéd FC players
Debreceni VSC players
S.P.A.L. players
Újpest FC players
Vasas SC players
BFC Siófok players
ŠK 1923 Gabčíkovo players
Vecsés FC footballers
Nemzeti Bajnokság II players
Nemzeti Bajnokság I players
Hungarian expatriate footballers
Expatriate footballers in Italy
Expatriate footballers in Slovakia
Hungarian expatriate sportspeople in Italy
Hungarian expatriate sportspeople in Slovakia